Jodie Cunningham is an English rugby league footballer who plays as a  or  at international level for England and domestically for St Helens in the Women's Super League.

Cunningham started paying rugby while a pupil at Cardinal Newman Catholic High School, Warrington and was selected to play for England while still in the sixth-form and playing for Warrington Ladies RC.

While a student at Leeds University, Cunningham played in the 2013 Women's Rugby League World Cup and joined Thatto Heath Crusaders and was a member of the team that won the Challenge Cup  in four successive seasons from 2013 to 2016.

Cunningham was vice-captain of the England team in the 2017 Women's Rugby League World Cup and in March 2018 Cunningham became a member of the newly-formed St Helens women's team, though she missed most of the 2018 season due to rehabilitation after surgery on an anterior cruciate ligament injury suffered during the 2017 season.

For the 2019 season, Cunningham was appointed co-captain of the St Helens side alongside Tara Jones  With the 2020 season cancelled, 2021 saw Cunningham appointed captain of the team and she led the side to the first treble since the creation of the Women's Super League. Cunningham was also named 2021 Woman of Steel.

Cunningham works as community engagement lead for the organisers of the 2021 Rugby League World Cup as well as being an ambassador for the women's tournament.

Cunningham was appointed as the RFL's National Women’s and Girls’ Development Manager in November 2021.

2022 saw St Helens retain the Challenge Cup with Cunningham scoring a try in the final against Leeds Rhinos.  In the Super  League Cunningham captained St Helens to second place in the league but the team were unable to repeat their 2021 successes losing in the play-off semi-final to eventual Grand Final winners Leeds.

References

1991 births
Living people
Alumni of the University of Leeds
England women's national rugby league team players
English female rugby league players
Rugby league fullbacks
Rugby league locks
Rugby league players from Warrington
St Helens R.F.C. captains
St Helens Women RLFC players